Frederick Peter Fass (October 30, 1859 – July 5, 1930) was a professional baseball player.  He was a pitcher for one season (1887) with the Indianapolis Hoosiers.  For his career, he compiled an 0–1 record in four appearances, recording a 10.34 earned run average and no strikeouts.

He died in Burnt Mill, Colorado at the age of 70.

See also
 List of Major League Baseball annual saves leaders

References

1859 births
1930 deaths
Major League Baseball pitchers
Indianapolis Hoosiers (NL) players
Baseball players from Milwaukee
Milwaukee Brewers (minor league) players
19th-century baseball players